"Feelin' the Same Way" is a song from American singer-songwriter Norah Jones's debut album, Come Away with Me (2002). It was written by Lee Alexander, and produced by Jones. Released in the United Kingdom on August 5, 2002, the song charted at number 72 on the UK Singles Chart.

Charts

References

2002 singles
2002 songs
Blue Note Records singles
Norah Jones songs
Songs written by Lee Alexander (musician)